Icerigger is a 1974 science fiction novel by American writer Alan Dean Foster. Like many of Foster's science-fiction novels, Icerigger takes place within his Humanx Commonwealth fictional universe.  The book's two sequels are Mission to Moulokin and The Deluge Drivers.

Plot

After an unfortunate accident, Ethan Fortune, a simple salesman and sophisticated interstellar traveler, finds himself stranded on the deadly frozen world of Tran-Ky-Ky with professional adventurer Skua September. Together they search for a way off the planet while fighting against both the extreme weather and deadly fauna of the alien world.

References

External links

Alan Dean Foster homepage

1974 American novels
American science fiction novels
Humanx Commonwealth
Novels by Alan Dean Foster
1974 science fiction novels
Ballantine Books books